The National Assembly is the lower chamber of Namibia's bicameral Parliament. Its laws must be approved by the National Council, the upper house. Since 2014, it has a total of 104 members. 96 members are directly elected through a system of closed list proportional representation and serve five-year terms. Eight additional members are appointed by the President. Since 2015, SWAPO member Peter Katjavivi has been the Speaker of the National Assembly.

Namibia's National Assembly emerged on Independence Day on 21 March 1990 from the Constituent Assembly of Namibia, following the elections of November 1989. That election, following guidelines established by the United Nations, included foreign observers in an effort to ensure a free and fair election process. The current National Assembly was formed following elections on 27 November 2019.

2019 elections

Previous National Assembly election results

Despite being a one party dominant state since its independence in 1990, Namibian elections have been transparent, free, and largely fair.

See also
 National Council of Namibia - the upper chamber of Parliament
 History of Namibia
 List of National Assemblies of Namibia
 List of speakers of the National Assembly of Namibia
 Legislative branch
 List of national legislatures

References

External links
 

 
Government of Namibia
Namibia
1990 establishments in Namibia